Lucifer Rising is an original Virgin New Adventures novel written by Jim Mortimore and Andy Lane and based on the long-running British science fiction television series Doctor Who. It features the Seventh Doctor, Ace and Bernice. A prelude to the novel, also penned by Mortimore and Lane, appeared in Doctor Who Magazine #199.

1993 British novels
1993 science fiction novels
Virgin New Adventures
Novels by Andy Lane
Novels by Jim Mortimore
Seventh Doctor novels